

Further reading 

  — also includes Mount Beppo State School, Ivorys Creek Provisional School, Cross Roads Provisional School, Ottaba Provisional School, Murrumba State School, Mount Esk Pocket School, Kipper Provisional School, Lower Cressbrook School, Fulham School, Sandy Gully State School, Cooeeimbardi State School, Scrub Creek State School

Lower Cressbrook is a rural locality in the Somerset Region, Queensland, Australia. In the  Lower Cressbrook had a population of 16 people.

Geography
The land use is predominantly grazing on native vegetation with some crop growing in the north-west of the locality.

History 
In the  Lower Cressbrook had a population of 16 people.

References

Further reading 

  — also includes Mount Beppo State School, Ivorys Creek Provisional School, Cross Roads Provisional School, Ottaba Provisional School, Murrumba State School, Mount Esk Pocket School, Kipper Provisional School, Lower Cressbrook School, Fulham School, Sandy Gully State School, Cooeeimbardi State School, Scrub Creek State School

Suburbs of Somerset Region
Localities in Queensland